Bispira volutacornis, sometimes known by the common names twin fan worm or spiral fan worm, is a type of tube worm found in the shallow sublittoral zone of the eastern Atlantic Ocean. Bispira volutacornis has a parchment-like tube with a mucoid outer layer which is often coated with mud or silt. The tube is usually concealed in a crevice and the worm can retract into the tube when disturbed.

Description
Bispira volutacornis tends to grow in colonial groups. Each individual worm has a double-headed crown formed from several whorls of up to 200 feathery plumes. There are one or more pairs of composite eyes on the outer side of the crown. The outside of the tube is often covered with mud or silt. When the crown is retracted, the top of the tube becomes pinched together, forming a figure-of-eight shape.

Distribution and habitat
Bispira volutacornis is found in the Eastern North Atlantic Ocean, the northern North Sea, the English Channel and the Mediterranean Sea. It is found growing in crevices and in stony areas and prefers areas rich in sediment but with low levels of illumination.

Ecology
Bispira volutacornis feeds on plankton which it captures with its plumes. It also uses the plumes to gather sediment with which to expand the tube. Each worm is either male or female, and the gametes are released into the water column, where fertilisation occurs. The worm is sometimes parasitised by the Gastrodelphis clausii, a small copepod; one or several of these copepods move around in the crown of plumes, and seem to be obligate parasites of Bispira volutacornis.

References

Sabellida
Fauna of the Atlantic Ocean
Fauna of the Mediterranean Sea
Animals described in 1804
Taxa named by George Montagu (naturalist)